is a national highway in the Japanese prefecture of Aomori. Route 102 stretches  from National Route 7 in Hirosaki east to National Routes 4 and 45 in Towada.

Route description

The highway crosses the central part Aomori Prefecture, linking Towada in the east to Hirosaki in the west. From Towada, the highway parallels the Oirase River to Lake Towada where it runs along the northern shore of the caldera crater lake. On the shore of the lake, it comes close to crossing into Akita Prefecture, but remains in Aomori. It then heads northwest passing through Hirakawa and Kuroishi. In Kuroishi, the road has a junction with the Tōhoku Expressway. West of this junction to the route's western terminus in Hirosaki, National Route 102 is designated as a Regional High-Standard Highway. The highway ends at a junction with National Route 7 near the center of Hirosaki.

History
National Route 102 was originally designated on 18 May 1953 as route connecting Hirosaki to Hachinohe. On 1 April 1963, the route was truncated to its current route. The section between Towada and Hachinohe was incorporated into Route 45.

Major junctions
The route lies entirely within Aomori Prefecture.

References

102
Roads in Aomori Prefecture
Regional High-Standard Highways in Japan